Pirojpur-4 is a defunct constituency represented in the Jatiya Sangsad (National Parliament) of Bangladesh abolished in 1988.

Members of Parliament

References

External links 

 

Former parliamentary constituencies of Bangladesh
Pirojpur District